The men's 110 metres hurdles event at the 2009 Summer Universiade was held on 10–11 July.

Medalists

Results

Heats
Qualification: First 3 of each heat (Q) and the next 4 fastest (q) qualified for the semifinals.

Wind:Heat 1: ? m/s, Heat 2: -1.2 m/s, Heat 3: 0.0 m/s, Heat 4: +0.9 m/s

Semifinals
Qualification: First 3 of each semifinal (Q) and the next 2 fastest (q) qualified for the finals.

Wind:Heat 1: +1.0 m/s, Heat 2: +1.2 m/s

Final
Wind: +0.8 m/s

References
Results (archived)

110
2009